Walter Dodd may refer to:
 Walter F. Dodd (1880–1960), professor of political science
 Walter J. Dodd (1869–1916), American physician and radiologist